Pelinkovac is a bitter liqueur based on wormwood (Croatian and Slovenian: pelen or pelin), popular in Croatia, Serbia, Montenegro, Bosnia and Herzegovina, North Macedonia, Bulgaria as well as in Slovenia, where it is known as pelinkovec or pelinovec. The alcohol content is 28–35% by volume. It has a very bitter taste, resembling that of Jägermeister.

History
Badel Pelinkovac was the first Croatian drink to be enjoyed in the court of Napoleon III of France.

In January 2017, Badel Pelinkovac started exports to the United States. It took two years for the company to get the permits to export to the USA. The drink was already exported to 30 countries worldwide.

Brands
In Croatia:
Pelinkovac by Dalmacijavino (Split, Croatia). 28% alcohol.
Maraska Pelinkovac by Maraska Distillery (Zadar, Croatia). 28% alcohol.
Rovinjski Pelinkovac by Darna Distillery (Rovinj, Croatia).
Badel Pelinkovac by the Badel Distillery (Zagreb, Croatia) since 1871. 32% alcohol.

In Serbia:
Gorki List made by Subotičanka (Subotica, Vojvodina). Since 2009, when Subotičanka went into bankruptcy, the production and bottling of this brand has been moved to Slovenia. Currently the brand is the property of the Slovenian company Grenki List.

In Bosnia-Herzegovina:
Zlatni Pelin by MB Impex (Banja Luka, Bosnia and Herzegovina) since 2006. Contains 23 herbs. 28% alcohol.

Pelinkovac is also produced by a number of small distilleries in Slovenia, Istria and in the city of Trieste and Friuli, Italy.

In United States:
Pelinkovac - Bottled by Marsalle Company, Louisville, KY.  35% alcohol

Variations
Half Pelinkovac
Pelinkovac Orange
Premium Pelinkovac (Antique Pelinkovac)
Štrukani pelinkovac - a slice of lemon is squeezed into serving of regular pelinkovac

Similar drinks
Bulgaria: The pelin is a type of wine with up to 34 herbs and some fruits added, including wormwood, St John's wort, apple and quince. It is often sold carbonated.
Romania: The  is wormwood wine consisting mainly of bittered wine.
Poland: The liqueur called Piołunówka is considered a type of nalewka.

See also
Slivovitz
Absinthe

References

External links
“Centuries-old Tales” – The 150-Year Story of Pelinkovac, Croatia Week, 19 June 2015

Liqueurs
Bitters
Absinthe
Herbal liqueurs
Bosnia and Herzegovina alcoholic drinks
Croatian distilled drinks
Montenegrin distilled drinks
Serbian distilled drinks
Slovenian distilled drinks